Acalyptris bipinnatellus is a species of moth of the family Nepticulidae. It was first described by Wilkinson in 1979. It is known to be found in Florida, a state of the United States.

References

Nepticulidae
Endemic fauna of Florida
Moths of North America
Moths described in 1979